Aybüke is a common feminine Turkish given name. The name has the meaning "very intelligent woman (queen), as beautiful and bright as the moon".

 Aybüke Aktuna (born 1994), Turkish archer
 Aybüke Arslan (born 1994), Turkish footballer
 Aybüke Pusat (born in 1995), Turkish beauty pageant

Turkish feminine given names